Curt Porter (born July 11, 1988 in Fayette, Alabama) was an American football guard in the National Football League for the Denver Broncos.  He played college football  at Jacksonville State, where he was named first-team all-American for the NCAA Division I Football Championship Subdivision by the Associated Press.

College
2009
 Second-team All-OVC. 
 Started all 11 games and graded out better than 91 percent on the season. 
 Led the offensive line with 315 bonus points after recording 93 knockdowns with 55 pancake blocks after playing a total of 711 snaps. 
 Instrumental in the Gamecocks leading the OVC rushing offense and passing efficiency, among several other offensive categories.

2008
 Started all 11 games at left tackle for the Gamecocks as a sophomore.
 Led the team with 94 knockdowns and was tied for second with 12 pancakes.
 Played a team-high 728 snaps and graded 75 percent on the season.
 Had 16 knockdowns against Alabama A&M on Sept. 6, while picking up 13 in a game twice (at UT Martin on Oct. 23 and at Tennessee Tech on Nov. 8).
 Graded a team-best 88 percent vs. Austin Peay on Nov. 1.
 His 78 percent grade at UTC on Sept. 20 was the highest on the team.

2007
 Played in nine games as a redshirt-freshman.
 Earned highest grades in final three games of the season including a season-high 76 percent in win over Samford.
 Graded out at 72 percent for the season.

2006
 Redshirted.

Football life
In high school Porter played for head coach Waldon Tucker.

References

 

1988 births
Living people
People from Fayette, Alabama
American football offensive guards
Denver Broncos players
Jacksonville State Gamecocks football players